Franz Joseph Kallenbach (21 August 1893 – 11 September 1944) was a German mycologist.

Notes

German mycologists
1893 births
1944 deaths